"Absolutely" is a song by Eurogliders, released in February 1986 as the fourth single from their third studio album, Absolutely! (1985). The song peaked at number 29 on the Australian Kent Music Report. Part of the music video was filmed on top of Australian heritage artifact, Sydney Water Reservoir Number 1  in Sydney's Centennial Park.

Track listing
7" Single
Side A "Absolutely"
Side B "Learning How to Swim"

12" Single
Side A "Absolutely" (Extended Mix) - 6:41
Side B "Rescue Me"  (Recorded Live at Billboard, Melbourne)  - 2:59

2x 7" Single
Side A "Absolutely"
Side B "Rescue Me"  (Recorded Live at Billboard, Melbourne)  
Side C "Absolutely"  (Recorded Live at Billboard, Melbourne) 
Side D "Rescue Me"  (Recorded Live at Billboard, Melbourne)

Chart performance

References

1986 singles
Eurogliders songs
1985 songs
CBS Records singles